Lorsch may refer to several different things:

 Lorsch, a town in the Bergstraße district in Hesse, Germany
 Lorsch Abbey, former one of the most renowned monasteries of the Carolingian Empire
 Lorsch codex, an important historical document created between about 1175 to 1195 in the Monastery of Saint Nazarius in Lorsch, Germany

People
 Jay Lorsch (born 1932), American organizational theorist
 Robert Lorsch, Los Angeles businessman